Rafiabad Assembly constituency is one of the 87 constituencies in the Jammu and Kashmir Legislative Assembly of Jammu and Kashmir a north state of India. Rafiabad is also part of Baramulla Lok Sabha constituency.

Member of Legislative Assembly

 1962: Ghulam Rasul Kar, National Conference
 1967: Ghulam Rasul Kar, Indian National Congress
 1972: Mohamad Yosuf Dar, Jammu & Kashmir National Conference
 1977: Mohmad Dilawar Mir, Jammu & Kashmir National Conference
 1983: Mohmad Dilawar Mir, Jammu & Kashmir National Conference
 1987: Gulam Mohamad Khan, Jammu & Kashmir National Conference
 1996: Mohmad Dilawar Mir, Janata Dal
 2002: Mohmad Dilawar Mir, Jammu & Kashmir National Conference
 2006 by election: Mohmad Dilawar Mir, Jammu and Kashmir Peoples Democratic Party
 2008: Javaid Ahmad Dar, Jammu & Kashmir National Conference

Election results

2014

See also
 Rafiabad, India
 List of constituencies of Jammu and Kashmir Legislative Assembly

References

Assembly constituencies of Jammu and Kashmir
Baramulla district